Mitzi Gaynor (born Francesca Marlene de Czanyi von Gerber; September 4, 1931) is an American actress, singer, and dancer. Her notable films include We're Not Married! (1952), There's No Business Like Show Business (1954), The Birds and the Bees (1956), and South Pacific, the 1958 motion picture adaptation of the stage musical by Rodgers and Hammerstein. She is one of the last surviving stars from the Golden Age of Hollywood cinema.

Early life
Mitzi Gaynor was born as Francesca Marlene de Czanyi von Gerber in Chicago to Henry de Czanyi von Gerber, a violinist, cellist, and music director of Hungarian descent, and his wife, Pauline, a dancer. 

By her father's second marriage, she became stepsister to anti-war activist Donald W. Duncan. The family first moved to Elgin, Illinois, and then to Detroit, and later when she was eleven, on to Hollywood. She trained as a ballerina as a child and began her career in the corps de ballet. At 13, she was singing and dancing with the Los Angeles Civic Light Opera company. She lied about her address so she could attend Le Conte Junior High in Hollywood.

Career

20th Century Fox
Gaynor signed a seven-year contract with Twentieth Century-Fox at age 17. She sang, acted, and danced in a number of film musicals, often paired with some of the biggest male musical stars of the day. A Fox Studio executive thought that Mitzi Gerber sounded like the name of a delicatessen, and they came up with a name that used the same initials.

Gaynor made her film debut in a musical, My Blue Heaven (1950); Betty Grable and Dan Dailey starred and she had a supporting role. A college drama Take Care of My Little Girl (1951) followed with Gaynor playing the roommate of Jeanne Crain.

Stardom

Fox then gave Gaynor a star part, in the musical biopic Golden Girl (1951), playing Lotta Crabtree. It was a mild success at the box office. Gaynor was one of several stars in the anthology comedy We're Not Married! (1952), then she was top billed in the musical, Bloodhounds of Broadway (1952), which made $2 million (equivalent to $ million in ).

Fox put her in another biopic, The I Don't Care Girl (1952) and she played Eva Tanguay. The film made $1.25 million. Gaynor starred in Down Among the Sheltering Palms (1953), playing a South Sea island girl. She was the female lead in a Western, Three Young Texans (1954). Gaynor's most popular film in her time at Fox was Irving Berlin's There's No Business Like Show Business (1954). She was billed after Ethel Merman, Dan Dailey, Marilyn Monroe, Donald O'Connor and Johnnie Ray.

Jack Bean

Gaynor married Jack Bean, a talent agent and public relations executive for MCA, in San Francisco on November 18, 1954. Their home was on North Arden Drive in Beverly Hills, California. She had just been released from Twentieth Century-Fox (before the start of There's No Business Like Show Business) with four years left on her contract and decided with the time off to get married. The union was childless. After their marriage, Bean quit MCA and started his publicity firm called Bean & Rose and managed Gaynor's career.

Paramount
In 1956, Gaynor appeared in the Paramount remake of Anything Goes, co-starring Bing Crosby, Donald O'Connor, and Zizi Jeanmaire, loosely based on the musical by Cole Porter, P.G. Wodehouse and Guy Bolton. Paramount cast her in another remake, The Birds and the Bees (1956), playing the role originated by Barbara Stanwyck in The Lady Eve (1941). Her third film for Paramount was The Joker Is Wild (1957), a biopic of Joe E. Lewis starring Frank Sinatra, in which Gaynor played the female lead. In 1957, Gaynor appeared in MGM's Les Girls, directed by George Cukor, with Gene Kelly and Kay Kendall.

South Pacific
Her biggest international fame came from her starring role as Ensign Nellie Forbush in the film version of Rodgers and Hammerstein's South Pacific. For her performance, she was nominated for a Best Actress Golden Globe Award.

Gaynor followed this with a comedy at MGM, Happy Anniversary (1959) opposite David Niven, and the United Kingdom production Surprise Package (1960), a musical comedy thriller directed by Stanley Donen. Her co-stars were Yul Brynner and Noël Coward. The film's theme song was composed by Jimmy Van Heusen and Sammy Cahn, music and lyrics, respectively. Dancing and singing in a duet with Noël Coward, Gaynor performed this song in the film.   Her latest film role was For Love or Money (1963), starring Kirk Douglas.

Later career
Following her film work, Gaynor performed in other media. She appeared between two sets by The Beatles when they made their second appearance on The Ed Sullivan Show on February 16, 1964. She performed for a nine-minute segment from the stage of the Deauville Hotel, in Miami Beach, separated by one commercial break. She sang "Too Darn Hot" and a blues medley. At the 1967 Academy Awards ceremony, she sang the theme from the film Georgy Girl. Gaynor later added the number to her concert repertoire. Through the 1960s and 1970s, she starred in nine television specials that garnered 16 Emmy nominations.

During her nightclub years, Gaynor developed and rehearsed her routines at The Cave, a club in Vancouver. She became fond of the city and frequently made guest appearances on local television for interviews. "Mitzi's back in town" became an annual slogan when Gaynor would come to the city for a number of weeks each year to develop her Las Vegas routines.

Gaynor recorded two albums for the Verve Records label, one called Mitzi and the second called Mitzi Gaynor Sings the Lyrics of Ira Gershwin. She is thought to have earned more from the record royalties on the South Pacific soundtrack album than her salary for the movie. She also recorded the title song from her film Happy Anniversary for the Top Rank label. For several decades, Gaynor appeared regularly in Las Vegas and at nightclub and concert venues throughout the United States and Canada.

During the 1990s, Gaynor became a featured columnist for the newsmagazine The Hollywood Reporter.

On December 4, 2006, Jack Bean, Gaynor's husband of 52 years, died of pneumonia in the couple's Beverly Hills home, aged 84. A producer and personal manager, Bean guided Gaynor's career.

On July 30, 2008, Gaynoralong with Kenny Ortega, Elizabeth Berkley, Shirley MacLaine, and the cast members from High School Musical, So You Think You Can Dance, Dancing with the Stars, and other performersappeared on the Academy of Television Arts and Sciences TV Moves Live, a celebration of 60 years of dance on television. Gaynor appeared performing the final few bars of "Poor Papa", a song-and-dance number from her 1969 TV special, Mitzi's 2nd Special. Four months later, on November 18, 2008, City Lights Pictures released Mitzi Gaynor Razzle Dazzle: The Special Years, a documentary celebrating Gaynor's annual television specials of the 1960s and 1970s. The film, which was broadcast on public television and released on DVD, includes moments from the original specials (digitally remastered in 5.1 stereo) along with newly taped interviews with Gaynor colleagues, friends, and admirers, including Bob Mackie, Carl Reiner, Kristin Chenoweth, Rex Reed, Tony Charmoli, Alton Ruff, Randy Doney, and Kelli O'Hara. Gaynor's one-woman show, Razzle Dazzle: My Life Behind the Sequins, toured the United States and Vancouver from 2009 thru 2014, including a two-week engagement in New York City.

Honors
On October 14, 2006, the NY Alumni "adopted" Gaynor as an official "New Yorker" at Beverly Hills High School. New York City mayor Michael Bloomberg issued a proclamation paying tribute to her distinguished career as a singer, dancer, actress and writer.

On April 10, 2007, she was honored by the Museum of Television & Radio in Los Angeles with a special evening celebrating her television specials of the 1960s–1970s. The sold-out event, Mitzi Gaynor Razzle-Dazzle!: The Special Years, featured a screening followed by a panel discussion with Gaynor, designer Bob Mackie and director-choreographer Tony Charmoli. In conjunction with the event, the museum also featured a month-long gallery exhibit, Mitzi by Mackie, featuring Bob Mackie's Emmy-winning costumes from her specials along with a selection of costumes from Gaynor's legendary stage shows and concert appearances.

On March 8, 2009, Gaynor was honored with the 2009 Boston Youth Moves lifetime achievement award, presented by Chita Rivera at Swellegance, the Boston Youth Moves annual fundraiser in Boston.

On November 7, 2009, Gaynor was honored with Chapman University's lifetime achievement in the arts award during the 28th annual American celebration gala night at Chapman University in Orange, California. On July 10, 2009, she was honored with the Tremaine 2009 entertainer of the year award from the Joe Tremaine dance competition nationals final gala in Orlando, Florida.

On April 13, 2010, she was honored with the Bob Harrington Lifetime Achievement Award at the 25th annual Bistro Awards in New York City.

On April 18, 2010, Gaynor won the 2010 National Academy of Television Arts & Sciences - New York Chapter Emmy Award for Outstanding Entertainment Program/Special for her public television musical documentary "Mitzi Gaynor: Razzle Dazzle! The Special Years".

On September 10, 2016, Gaynor was honored with the inaugural "Legend Award" from Nigel Lythgoe's Dizzy Feet Foundation.

On September 30, 2017, Gaynor was inducted into the Great American Songbook Hall of Fame, which celebrates lyricists, composers, and performers who helped to create “the soundtrack of our lives” with their contribution to American Popular song, by its founder Michael Feinstein.

Television specials
On October 14, 1968, Gaynor starred in her first television special, Mitzi. In specials including Mitzi – The First Time and Mitzi ... Zings into Spring she showcased the talents she had first used as a theatrical performer, then in films like There's No Business Like Show Business, Les Girls, and South Pacific, and finally as a concert performer.

List of television specials
 The Kraft Music Hall: The Mitzi Gaynor Christmas Show (1967) (NBC)
 Mitzi (1968) (NBC)
 Mitzi's 2nd Special (1969) (NBC)
 Mitzi...The First Time (1973) (CBS)
 Mitzi...A Tribute to the American Housewife (1974) (CBS)
 Mitzi...and a Hundred Guys (1975) (CBS)
 Mitzi...Roarin' In the 20's (1976) (CBS)
 Mitzi...Zings Into Spring (1977) (CBS)
 Mitzi...What's Hot, What's Not (1978) (CBS)
 Mitzi Gaynor: Razzle Dazzle! The Special Years (2008) (PBS)

Filmography

References

External links

1931 births
Living people
Actresses from Chicago
American people of Hungarian descent
American female dancers
American film actresses
American women jazz singers
American jazz singers
20th Century Studios contract players
Dancers from Illinois
Dancers from California
Jazz musicians from Illinois